Stanthorne is a former civil parish, now in the parish of Stanthorne and Wimboldsley, in Cheshire West and Chester, England.  It contains eleven buildings that are recorded in the National Heritage List for England as designated listed buildings, all of which are listed at Grade II.  This grade is the lowest of the three gradings given to listed buildings and is applied to "buildings of national importance and special interest".  The parish is entirely rural, and this is reflected in the nature of many of the listed buildings.  The River Wheelock, the Shropshire Union Canal, and its Middlewich Branch pass through the parish, and there are listed buildings associated with all three waterways.

References
Citations

Sources

Listed buildings in Cheshire West and Chester
Lists of listed buildings in Cheshire